Piran Rural District is in the Central District of Piranshahr County, West Azerbaijan province, Iran. At the National Census of 2006, its population was 12,599 in 2,257 households. There were 15,676 inhabitants in 3,613 households at the following census of 2011. At the most recent census of 2016, the population of the rural district was 9,412 in 2,226 households. The largest of its 34 villages was Ziveh, with 1,323 people.

References 

Piranshahr County

Rural Districts of West Azerbaijan Province

Populated places in West Azerbaijan Province

Populated places in Piranshahr County